Fletching is the fin-shaped aerodynamic stabilization device attached on arrows, bolts, darts, or javelins, and are typically made from light semi-flexible materials such as feathers or bark. Each piece of such fin is a fletch, also known as a flight or feather. A fletcher is a person who attaches fletchings to the shaft of arrows.

The word is related to the French word , meaning 'arrow', via the ultimate root of Old Frankish .

Description
As a noun, fletching refers collectively to the fins or vanes, each of which individually is known as a fletch. Traditionally, the fletching consists of three matched half-feathers attached near the back of the arrow or  shaft of the dart that are equally spaced around its circumference. Four fletchings have also been used. 

In English archery, the male feather, from a cock, is used on the outside of the arrow, while the other two stabilizing feathers are from a female, or hen. Traditional archery lore about feather curvature is that a right handed archer should shoot a right winged feather and right handed helical, and a left handed archer should use the opposite. Slow motion cameras show the arrow does not begin to spin until it is well past the riser, and the most important point is to have consistency in fletching. Shooting a feathered arrow with a bow with a riser shelf, instead of a plastic vane, is wiser since the feathers will compress and flatten while coming off the bow.

On compound bows, feathers may be a hindrance, and plastic vanes are a better solution. At the high speeds coming off a compound bow, plastic vanes with no curvature still allow the arrow to fly straight without tumbling. Also, noise is increased with feathers on these higher-powered bows, which can be a problem for hunters.

Today, modern plastics may be used instead. Fletches were traditionally attached with glue and silk thread, but with modern glue/thread/tape this is no longer necessary, unless the arrow is a reproduction of a historical arrow. The fletching is used to stabilize the arrow aerodynamically. Feather fletches impart a natural spin on an arrow due to the rough and smooth sides of a feather and the natural curve, determined by which wing the feather came from. Vanes need to be placed at a slight angle (called an offset fletch), or set into a twist (called a helical fletch) to create the same effect,  but all are there to impart stability to the projectile to ensure that the projectile does not tumble during flight. 

More generally, "fletching" can refer to any structures added to a projectile to aerodynamically stabilize its flight, many of which resemble arrows in form and function.  For instance, the feathers at the butt end of a dart (of the type cast using an atlatl) are very similar in purpose and construction to those used in arrows.  Most of the techniques of fletching were likely adapted from earlier dart-making techniques. The fins used to stabilize rockets work in a similar manner.

See also
Flechette
Fletcher (surname)
Hane, fletching of the Japanese arrow (ya).

References

Further reading
 Blau, Sarah. An Investigation of Arrow Position As Affected by Fletching Number. 2007. Dissertation: B.S. Guilford College 2007.
 Brotzman, Richard E., and Ol'e Buff Archery. Arrowsmithing. 1995. Abstract: Designed for the beginner interested in building their own wooden and reed arrows from bare shafting materials using both traditional and primitive methods.
 Cheney, C. 1999. "Bow Hunting: Arrow Fletching, Nocks and Points". SA Wild & Jag = SA Game & Hunt. 5, no. 8: 21,23. Abstract: Describes the function of arrow fletching in bow hunting or bow competitions. Mentions materials that fletches are made of. Discusses the nocks, points, broadheads and cresting that are important components of arrows. Includes illustrations.
 Dudley, J. 2008. "The Best Fletching for Your Arrows". Africa's Bowhunter & Archer. 9, no. 3: 30–31. Abstract: Suggests four fletching type options for your arrows. Explains the fletching test.
 Hamm, Jim. Bows & Arrows of the Native Americans: A Complete Step-by-Step Guide to Wooden Bows, Sinew-Backed Bows, Composite Bows, Strings, Arrows & Quivers. New York, NY: Lyons & Burford in cooperation with Bois d'Arc Press, 1991. Abstract: A step-by-step guide to Native American bows and arrows, including information on how to build and care for wooden bows, sinew-backed bows, composite bows, strings, arrows, and quivers.
 Herrin, Al. Cherokee Bows and Arrows: How to Make and Shoot Primitive Bows and Arrows. 1989. Abstract: The author reveals in step-by-step detail the Cherokee secrets for making bows and arrows from materials found in nature and for shooting them by ancient Cherokee methods
 Massey, Jim. (1992). "Self Arrows" in The Traditional Bowyer's Bible Volume One, (Jim Hamm, ed.). Guilford: The Lyons Press. 
 Engh, Douglas. Topic "Arrows" in "Archery Fundamentals". Human Kinetics 
 Sarich, Steven J. Variations in Arrow Technology: An Experimental Exploration of the Effectiveness of Fletching. DigitalCommons@University of Nebraska–Lincoln, 2011. A paper that gives some attention to the small amount of research done on fletching by archaeologists and then goes on to describe the production and effectiveness of fletching when added to the arrow.
Soar Hugh David. Straight and True. a select history of the arrow. Westholme publishing 
 De Villiers, A. 2010. "Overfletched or Underfletched?" Africa's Bowhunter. 11, no. 1: 15,17. Summary: Discusses arrow fletching and how to achieve a compromise between a number of factors so as to achieve the optimal configuration.

Archery
Projectiles